Lodovico Buffetti (Verona, 1722- March 1782) was an Italian painter.

Biography
Born to a pharmacist, he trained in Verona under Simone Brentana, but moved and worked mainly in Vicenza. He painted sacred subjects. His son, Giuseppe Buffetti, also became a painter.

He painted an altarpiece depicting St Vincent Ferrer performing miracle for San Pietro in Monastero. He painted a Marriage of the Virgin and a Glory of St Joseph for the suppressed Oratory of Santa Caterina presso Ognissanti. He painted a St Augustine meditating on the Trinity for the church of Santa Eufemia.  For the church of Santi Eleuterio e Barbara, he painted a Santi Coronati. For the church of the Filippini in Vicenza, he painted a St Anne, Virgin and young John the Baptist'''; a Samaritana at the well with Jesus; and Dinner at Emmaus''.  He also painted for the churches for San Girolamo, San Jacopo, and Santa Maria Maddalena.

References

1722 births
1782 deaths
18th-century Italian painters
Italian male painters
Painters from Verona
Painters from Vicenza
18th-century Italian male artists